, a Japanese band, formed in 1998 and made its major label debut in 2001. The name is a portmanteau of the two family names, Kentarō Kobuchi and Shunsuke Kuroda.

Members 
 
 
The band's visual appearance is unusual; there are only two people, and Kuroda stands over 193 cm (6'4") tall.

History
In May 1998, Kobuchi and Kuroda met each other in Sakai near Osaka. Kobuchi was a salesman who held street concerts every Saturday for relaxation and Kuroda was a physical education teacher and a street musician. In September the same year, Kobuchi offered Kuroda a song and seeing that Kuroda was not a skilled guitar player, Kobuchi became the guitar player of the group. Thus, Kobukuro was formed.

Kobukuro received moderately successful ratings for their first three indie albums—Saturday 8:PM (July 1999), ANSWER (December 2000) and Root of My Mind (March 2001). Kobukuro signed with Warner Music Japan in 2001, and made their debut with the hit single, "Yell" which reached number 4 on the Oricon Charts.

Kobukuro released the studio album Nameless World on December 21, 2005. Nameless World became their first number-one album on the Oricon weekly charts. On September 27, 2006, they released their greatest hits album All Singles Best, which topped the Oricon weekly charts for four consecutive weeks.

On March 21, 2007, Kobukuro released the single "Tsubomi." When the song "Tsubomi" was released, Marty Friedman pointed out that the song's arrangement was very simple and did away with the influence of the music of the Western culture. The song "Tsubomi" became their first number-one single on the Oricon weekly charts. "Tsubomi" won the coveted "Grand Prix" awards in December 2007 at the 49th Japan Record Awards. The song was included in their 2007 studio album 5296, which also topped the Oricon weekly charts.

On their 2009 album Calling, Kobuchi wrote "Sayonara Hero" as a memorial song for Kiyoshiro Imawano, who had died earlier that year. On March 3, 2010, they released their cover version of "Layla" (used in a Pepsi Nex commercial they starred in) as a digital single of iTunes Store without the release of the CD single.

When the Oricon weekly charts dated May 17, 2010 was released, the sales of All Singles Best passed 3,000,000 copies on the Oricon charts, becoming the first album to do so in 7 years 10 months since the 2002 achievement of Southern All Stars' Umi no Yeah!!, released on June 25, 1998.

Discography

Singles

Albums

Award

References

External links 
  Official Web Site of Kobukuro
  Official Web Site by Warner Music Japan

Japanese musical duos
Japanese pop music groups
Ballad music groups
Warner Music Japan artists
Musical groups from Osaka
Musical groups established in 1998
1998 establishments in Japan
Japanese boy bands